Qurmaş Sırjanulı (born May 1959) is a Chinese politician of Kazakh ethnicity who served as governor of Ili Kazakh Autonomous Prefecture between 2016 and 2021.

Biography 
Qurmaş Sırjanulı was born in Jinghe County, Xinjiang, in May 1959. He joined the Communist Party of China (CPC) in June 1984, and entered the workforce in the following month. He graduated from Kuitun Normal College and Xinjiang University. 

After university, he worked at Xinjiang Academy of Forestry Sciences. Beginning in December 1987, he served in several posts in the Organization Department of CPC Xinjiang Uygur Autonomous Region Committee, including section member, deputy director, and investigator. He became deputy director of the Administration of Press and Publication of Xinjiang Uygur Autonomous Region in August 2007 before being appointed deputy head of the Organization Department of CPC Xinjiang Uygur Autonomous Region Committee in March 2008. In August 2013, he was made deputy secretary of its Commission for Discipline Inspection, the party's agency in charge of anti-corruption efforts. In February 2016, he took office as governor of Ili Kazakh Autonomous Prefecture, replacing Mänen Zeýnelulı. He is now a member of the Standing Committee of the People's Congress of Xinjiang Uygur Autonomous Region.

References 

1959 births
Living people
People from Bortala
Xinjiang University alumni
Political office-holders in Xinjiang
Ili Kazakh Autonomous Prefecture governors
People's Republic of China politicians from Xinjiang
Chinese Communist Party politicians from Xinjiang
Kazakhs in China